Suj Tilla East is a Himalayan mountain peak in the eastern part of Uttarakhand state in Pithoragarh district of India. The peak is located above the junction of Kalabaland, Sankalp and Yankchar glaciers. Ralam Dhura pass is situated to the south of this peak, which connects Ralam valley to Darma valley. This peak is characterised by steep ice-flutings and sharp ridges, so named as 'Peak of needles'. This peak has not been climbed so far. The most popular route to the summit is through the south west face. Suj Tilla East is situated 200 m away from Suj Tilla West. Suj Tilla East is 21 m higher than Suj Tilla West. This peak is still an unclimbed peak due to sharp cornices and icefalls on the ridge.

References

Geography of Pithoragarh district
Mountains of Uttarakhand